Mahadewa is a village development committee in Morang District in the Kosi Zone of southeastern Nepal ( Ratuwa Mai Nagarpalika-3). In the 1991 national census, it had a population of 3713 people living in 780 individual households. Castes living in the area include Gangai (Singh), Rajbansi, Tajpurya, Maghi, and Jha.

References

Village development committees in Morang District
Ratuwamai Municipality